Christian "Blacky" Schwarzer (born 23 October 1969) is a now-retired professional German handball player and present-day coach. As a member of the Germany men's national handball team, he won the world championship in 2007 and the silver medal at the 2004 Olympics.

Schwarzer played for TV Niederwürzbach from 1991 to 1999. While playing for FC Barcelona Handbol from 1999 to 2001, the German handball player of the year 2001, won the National Championship of Spain, the National Cup of Spain and the EHF Champions League in 2000. Since 2001, he has played for TBV Lemgo, with which he won the National Cup of Germany in 2002, the National Championship of Germany in 2003 and the EHF Cup in 2006.

During his career, Schwarzer took part in six World Men's Handball Championships, five European Men's Handball Championships and three Olympic Games. He has participated in 310 international matches, with 949 goals. In 2004, he retired but was reactivated for the 2007 World Men's Handball Championship. After becoming World champion, he stepped down again and became a handball coach.

References

External links 
 
 
 

1969 births
Living people
German male handball players
German expatriate sportspeople in Spain
Olympic handball players of Germany
Olympic medalists in handball
Olympic silver medalists for Germany
Handball players at the 1996 Summer Olympics
Handball players at the 2000 Summer Olympics
Handball players at the 2004 Summer Olympics
Handball players at the 2008 Summer Olympics
Medalists at the 2004 Summer Olympics
Sportspeople from Braunschweig